Reto is a masculine given name, commonly used in Switzerland only.

Origin and meaning 
The name means "coming from / related to Rhaetia, Rhaetian Alps, Rhaetian people or Rhaeto-Romance languages".

Notable people 

Reto Berra - Swiss ice hockey player
Reto Capadrutt - Swiss bobsledder
Reto Grütter - Swiss sidecarcross passenger
Reto Götschi - Swiss bobsledder
Reto Salimbeni - Swiss film-maker
Reto Schenkel - Swiss sprinter
Reto Suri - Swiss ice hockey player
Reto Ziegler - Swiss footballer

Other uses 
Reto-Moto - Danish videogame developer

Names of Germanic origin